The 37th century BC was a century which lasted from the year 3700 BC to 3601 BC.

Events
 In the south of England, a rapid expansion of monument building occurred around 3700 BC.
 In the city of Uruk, southern Mesopotamia, groups of tokens representing commercial transactions begin to be enclosed in hollow clay balls and kept in archives.
 The Maykop culture, a major Bronze Age archaeological culture in the Western Caucasus region of Southern Russia, began around 3700 BC.
 Lothal of Indus Valley civilisation in India (3700 BC).

References

-3
-63